Enemion (false rue-anemone) are spring ephemerals with white flowers, branching stems, and finely divided leaves in the buttercup family. One species, Enemion biternatum, is native to eastern and central North America, while Enemion occidentale, stipitatum, hallii, and savilei are native to the West Coast of the United States and Canada. The genus Isopyrum is similar, and has species native to Europe and Asia.

Enemion comes from Ancient Greek  (ēnémion), another word for  "anemone".

References

External links

 
Ranunculaceae genera
Flora of North America
Taxa named by Constantine Samuel Rafinesque